Yiwu Airport  is a dual-use military and civil airport serving Yiwu, Jinhua in Zhejiang Province, China.

History
Yiwu airport was originally a military training airfield for the People's Liberation Army Navy.  In 1988 the national government approved the conversion of the airfield to a dual-use military and civil airport.  The airport was opened to civilian flights on 1 April 1991.  In December 1993 the airport was closed for a 100-million yuan expansion, and reopened in December 1994.  A second round of expansion began in 2006 with a total investment of 300 million yuan,  and a new terminal building was opened in April 2009.

Facilities
Yiwu Airport had a runway that was 2,500 meters long and 45 meters wide, and an 18,000 square-meter terminal building.  It is capable of handling 1 million passengers per year. In 2015, construction began to extend the runway by 500 meters and to build a parallel taxiway. The new 3,000-meter runway was opened on 13 November 2017, making the airport class 4D.

International terminal
On 6 January 2012, construction commenced for a new international terminal.  The project includes a 13,436 square-meter terminal building, three additional aircraft parking bays, expansion of car park, and building of new roads and bridges. The new terminal was opened in 2014.

Airlines and destinations

See also
List of airports in China
List of the busiest airports in China
List of People's Liberation Army Air Force airbases

References

Airports in Zhejiang
Chinese Air Force bases
Airports established in 1991
1991 establishments in China
Jinhua